, also Saroma Lagoon, is a coastal lagoon (hence a body of brackish water) in Saroma, Kitami, and Yūbetsu Hokkaidō, Japan. It is located in Abashiri Quasi-National Park. By area, the lake is the third largest in Japan and the largest in Hokkaidō.

The name comes from the Ainu place name Saruomahetsu, meaning "place of many Miscanthus reeds and rushes".

References

 SAROMA-KO, World Lakes Database, International Lake Environment Committee.

Lakes of Hokkaido
Lagoons of Japan